John Sheldon Cumberland (May 10, 1947 – April 5, 2022) was an American professional baseball pitcher and coach. A left-hander, Cumberland appeared in 110 games over all or parts of six Major League Baseball seasons between 1968 and 1974 as a member of the New York Yankees, San Francisco Giants, St. Louis Cardinals and California Angels.

Pitching career
Born in Westbrook, Maine, Cumberland played one season of college baseball at the University of Maine in Orono. He signed with the Philadelphia Phillies as an undrafted free agent before the 1966 minor-league season, which he spent with the Eugene Emeralds of the Class A Short Season Northwest League prior to his selection by the Yankees in the November draft.

The Yankees advanced Cumberland all the way to Triple-A for his next three pro campaigns. He posted a 26–20 won–lost record in 76 games between 1967 and 1969 for the Syracuse Chiefs of the International League. The  season began with him on the New York roster. He appeared in 15 games through July 19, eight as a starter, before being traded on July 20 to the Giants for fellow southpaw Mike McCormick.

Although Cumberland would be sent to Triple-A Phoenix for the month of August, the transaction led to his finest season-plus in the majors. When he was recalled to San Francisco in September 1970, he reeled off five stellar appearances as a relief pitcher, winning his only two decisions and allowing no earned runs in 9 innings pitched. Appearing in 45 games, 21 as a starter, and 185 innings, he compiled a 9–6 record, with five complete games, two shutouts, two saves, and 65 strikeouts, with a 2.92 earned run average, as the Giants won the 1971 National League West Division championship. Taking a turn between Baseball Hall of Fame hurlers Gaylord Perry, who started the opening game, and Juan Marichal, who would start Game 3, Cumberland started the second game of the NLCS against the Pittsburgh Pirates, but was relieved in the fourth inning with none out, a runner on base, and the Giants trailing 3–2. They were not able to overcome the early deficit, and when the game ended 9–4 Pittsburgh, Cumberland was charged with the loss.

He began  in the Giants' starting rotation but was ineffective, compiling a 9.68 earned run average through June 7. On June 16, he was dealt to the Cardinals, where he worked in 14 games but continued to struggle, putting up a 6.65 ERA as a member of the St. Louis bullpen. On November 29, he was traded along with Larry Hisle to the Minnesota Twins for Wayne Granger. But the Twins released Cumberland on April 10, 1973, and he spent the early part of season back in the Giants' organization at Triple-A Phoenix. When San Francisco released him on June 30, he signed the following day with the Angels' Triple-A affiliate in Salt Lake City. His nine-year professional pitching career ended that season.

All told, Cumberland appeared in 110 MLB games, 36 as a starting pitcher. He compiled a 15–16 won–lost mark with six complete games, two shutouts and two saves. In 334 innings pitched, he permitted 312 hits (including 46 home runs) and 103 bases on balls and 142 earned runs, with 137 strikeouts. He career ERA was 3.82.  In the postseason (the 1971 NLCS), he was 0–1 (9.00) in three full innings pitched, allowing seven hits and no bases on balls, with four strikeouts.

Coaching career
Cumberland began a 23-year professional baseball coaching career in the New York Mets' farm system in 1982 as pitching coach of Class A Lynchburg of the Carolina League. After three seasons, including 1983 when 18-year-old phenom Doc Gooden dominated the Carolina loop with a 19–4 (2.50) performance, Cumberland was promoted to Triple-A Tidewater, spending another three years there before he was named the Mets' 1989 minor league pitching coordinator. Cumberland left the Mets after the 1990 season, and worked as minor league pitching coordinator or Triple-A pitching coach for the Milwaukee Brewers and San Diego Padres.

He then briefly succeeded Joe Kerrigan (Williams' replacement) as pitching coach, before he was dropped from Kerrigan's staff on September 3 and left the Bosox' system for good. But he returned to the American League the next season as pitching coach of the Kansas City Royals under skipper Tony Peña from June 18, through June 29, .

Cumberland left baseball after departing Peña's staff in mid-2004. He died in Lutz, Florida, at 74, on April 5, 2022, survived by his wife of 52 years, three sons, a brother, a sister, and three grandchildren. A former member of the United States Army Reserve, he also was a member of the Maine Sports Hall of Fame.

References

External links

  
   
   

1947 births
2022 deaths
Baseball coaches from Maine
Baseball players from Maine
Boston Red Sox coaches
Boston Red Sox scouts
California Angels players
Eugene Emeralds players
Kansas City Royals coaches
Maine Black Bears baseball players
Major League Baseball bullpen coaches
Major League Baseball pitchers
Major League Baseball pitching coaches
Minor league baseball coaches
New York Yankees players
People from Westbrook, Maine
Phoenix Giants players
St. Louis Cardinals players
Salt Lake City Angels players
San Francisco Giants players
Syracuse Chiefs players